The Gallegos River is a river in the Argentine province of Santa Cruz, on whose estuary lies Río Gallegos city, capital of the province. Given that its basin reaches only the fringes of the Andes mountains it classifies as a sub-Andean river.

The is contradicting information on where river is actually formed. According to one source it forms at the confluence of the rivers Rubens and Penitente. Yet according to another source Rubens River is just a tributary of Penitente River and Gallegos River originates further downstream at the confluence of the rivers Penitentes and Turbio. After traveling  Gallegos River reaches the Atlantic Coast.

In spite of this, the river's stream can be drastically reduced during the dry season.

The river, named after Blasco Gallegos, one of the pilots of Ferdinand Magellan's expedition of 1520, is popular for fly fishing for brown trout, principally by tourists.

Part of the drainage basin of the river lies in Chile's Magallanes Region.

References

Rivers of Santa Cruz Province, Argentina
Rivers of Argentina